This is a list of forests in Serbia. 

 Košutnjak
 Molin Forest
 Topčider
 Rudnik
 Radovanjski Lug
 Šalinac Grove

 
Serbia
Forests